Agostini, Italian surname
 Agostini Fjord, a fjord in Tierra del Fuego
 Agostini v. Felton, a landmark decision of the Supreme Court of the United States
 Agostini's reaction, a simple medical test for the presence of glucose in urine
 Casa Agostini, a Classical Revival house designed by Miguel Briganti Pinti

See also 

 Agostino (disambiguation)
 De Agostini (disambiguation)